Walter Cass Newberry (December 23, 1835 – July 20, 1912) was a U.S. Representative from Illinois.

Newberry was born in Waterville, New York and enlisted in the Union Army during the Civil War as a private in the Eighty-first Regiment, New York Volunteers. He was promoted to lieutenant in 1861, captain in 1862, major of the Twenty-fourth Regiment, New York Cavalry, in 1863, lieutenant colonel and colonel in 1864, and was brevetted brigadier general March 31, 1865.

He moved to Petersburg, Virginia in 1865, and served as mayor of Petersburg in 1869 and 1870, resigning in the latter year. He moved to Richmond, Virginia in 1870, and was superintendent of public property for the state for four years.

He moved to Chicago, Illinois, in 1876, and was postmaster of Chicago in 1888 and 1889. Newberry was elected as a Democrat to the Fifty-second Congress (March 4, 1891 – March 3, 1893). He was not a candidate for renomination in 1892.

He died in Chicago on July 20, 1912, and was interred in Graceland Cemetery.

Source material

10,000 Famous Freemasons from K to Z, Volume 3, Page 262, By William R. Denslow, Harry S. Truman

References

External links
 
 Walter Cass Newberry Papers at Newberry Library

1835 births
1912 deaths
Burials at Graceland Cemetery (Chicago)
Union Army colonels
Democratic Party members of the United States House of Representatives from Illinois
People from Waterville, New York
19th-century American politicians
Postmasters of Chicago